Ernst Pistulla (28 November 1906 in Goslar – 14 September 1944) was a German boxer who competed in the 1928 Summer Olympics. Pistulla was the German amateur light heavyweight champion in 1928. He won the silver medal in the light heavyweight class after losing the final against Víctor Avendaño.

He was killed in action in the Soviet Union during World War II.

1928 Olympic results 
Below is the record of Ernst Pistulla, a German light heavyweight boxer who competed at the 1928 Amsterdam Olympics:

 Round of 16: Defeated Leon Lucas (United States) on points
 Quarterfinal: Defeated William Murphy (Ireland) on points
 Semifinal: Defeated Karel Miljon (Netherlands) on points
 Final: Lost to Victorio Avendano (Argentina) on points (was awarded silver medal)

Footnotes

External links

1906 births
1944 deaths
Light-heavyweight boxers
Olympic boxers of Germany
Boxers at the 1928 Summer Olympics
Olympic silver medalists for Germany
People from Goslar
Sportspeople from Lower Saxony
Olympic medalists in boxing
German male boxers
German military personnel killed in World War II
Medalists at the 1928 Summer Olympics
Missing in action of World War II